Sasti is a census town in Chandrapur district in the Indian state of Maharashtra.

Geography
Sasti is situated only a few miles from the Wardha River.

Demographics
As of the 2011 Census of India, Sasti has a population of 4,320. Males constitute 52% of the population and females make up 47%. Sasti has an average literacy rate of 81.43%, lower than the state average of 82.34%. Male literacy is 88.82%, and female literacy is 73.23%. In Sasti, 11.76% of the population are under 6 years of age. Dit is allemaal fake huts a niffo

Work Profile
Out of the total population, 1,720, or 39.81%, are engaged in work or business activity. Of this portion, 1,266 (29.31%) are male while 454 (10.51%) are female. In the census survey, "worker" is defined as a person who does business or has a job in service, agriculture, or labor. Of the total working population, 87.38% were engaged in Main Work while 12.62% of total workers were engaged in Marginal Work Its fake bc its fake

References

Cities and towns in Chandrapur district